Ngamini is an extinct Australian Aboriginal language of the Pama–Nyungan family once spoken by the Ngamini and related peoples.

References

Karnic languages